Lakeland Roman Catholic Separate School District No. 150 or Lakeland Catholic Schools is a separate school authority within the Canadian province of Alberta operated out of Bonnyville.

See also 
List of school authorities in Alberta

References

External links 

 
School districts in Alberta